Bareh Kalak (also Romanized as Bareh Kalaḵ) is a village in Boluran Rural District, Darb-e Gonbad District, Kuhdasht County, Lorestan Province, Iran. At the 2006 census, its population was 1,205, in 251 families.

References 

Towns and villages in Kuhdasht County